Hapalopilus is a genus of poroid fungi in the family Polyporaceae. The genus is widely distributed. Hapalopilus was circumscribed by Finnish mycologist Petter Adolf Karsten in 1881.

Species
, Index Fungorum accepts 15 species of Hapalopilus:
Hapalopilus africanus Ryvarden 1978 – Rwanda 
Hapalopilus albocitrinus (Petch) Ryvarden 1980 – Uganda 
Hapalopilus croceus (Pers.) Donk 1933 – Europe 
Hapalopilus flavus B.K.Cui & Y.C.Dai 2008 – China
Hapalopilus hispidulus (Berk. & M.A.Curtis) Murrill 1904 
Hapalopilus mutans (Peck) Gilb. & Ryvarden 1986 
Hapalopilus nidulans (Fr.) P.Karst. 1881 – widespread 
Hapalopilus ochraceolateritius (Bondartsev) Bondartsev & Singer 1941 – Europe 
Hapalopilus phlebiiformis (Berk. ex Cooke) Ryvarden 1987 
Hapalopilus placodes (Kalchbr.) N.Walters & E.W.B.Costa 1956 – Lord Howe Island
Hapalopilus priscus  (Niemelä, Miettinen & Manninen) Melo & Ryvarden (2014)
Hapalopilus rubescens Corner 1989 
Hapalopilus sibiricus Núñez, Parmasto & Ryvarden 2001 
Hapalopilus subtestaceus (Bres.) Bondartsev 1963 
Hapalopilus tropicus I.Lindblad & Ryvarden 1999

References

Polyporaceae
Polyporales genera
Taxa named by Petter Adolf Karsten
Taxa described in 1881